De Mattos v Gibson (1859) is an English case, concerning the taking/grant of security for a loan over property where the lender knows of a prior binding commitment.  The court held, on the facts, it would be only fair to postpone the power of sale asserting this as a general principle where facts are closely similar.

Facts
In 1857 the plaintiff had chartered a ship (The Allerton) to carry coal from the Tyne to Suez to fulfil a contract (a charter-party). In the Channel it suffered damage and put in for repairs. Gibson, who held a mortgage over the ship from next January, paid for repairs and effectively took possession (control) of the ship in October 1858 with a view to securing its return to Newcastle so that he could exercise his power of sale. The plaintiff applied for an injunction to restrain Gibson’s threatened action on the ground that it would be inconsistent with the legally required performance of the charter-party (in private, civil law) of which Gibson had known when he had taken his mortgage.

Judgment
Knight Bruce LJ held:

Applied in
Swiss Bank Corpn v Lloyds Bank Ltd [1979] Ch 548; [1979] 3 WLR 201; [1979] 2 All ER 853, High Court (EWHC) decision by Browne-Wilkinson J

Considered in
Law Debenture Trust Corpn v Ural Caspian Oil Corpn Ltd [1993] 1 WLR 138

Distinguished in
Bower v Bantam Investments Ltd [1972] 1 WLR 1120; [1972] 3 All ER 349, Ch D

See also
English property law
Unconscionability in English law

Notes

English property case law
1858 in case law
1858 in British law